Holtsås is a village in Sauherad municipality, Norway. It is located between Hjuksebø and Nordagutu.

Holtsås used to have a train station on the Sørlandet Line. The Hjuksebø train disaster occurred between Hjuksebø and Holtsås on 15 November 1950, and was Norway's worst railway accident in peacetime until the Tretten train disaster in 1975.

Villages in Vestfold og Telemark